741 Botolphia is a minor planet orbiting the Sun, discovered by Joel Hastings Metcalf on 10 February 1913 from Winchester. It is named after Saint Botolph, the semi-legendary founder of a 7th-century monastery that would become the town of Boston, Lincolnshire, England.

References

External links
 
 

Background asteroids
Botolphia
Botolphia
X-type asteroids (Tholen)
X-type asteroids (SMASS)
19130210